Cutter–Morning Star School District 21  is a school district in Garland County, Arkansas.

It includes a portion of Hot Springs.

References

External links

Education in Garland County, Arkansas
School districts in Arkansas
Hot Springs, Arkansas